David Harold Blackwell (April 24, 1919 – July 8, 2010) was an American statistician and mathematician who made significant contributions to game theory, probability theory, information theory, and statistics. He is one of the eponyms of the Rao–Blackwell theorem. He was the first African American inducted into the National Academy of Sciences, the first African American tenured faculty member at the University of California, Berkeley, and the seventh African American to receive a Ph.D. in mathematics. In 2012, President Obama posthumously awarded Blackwell the National Medal of Science. 

Blackwell was also a pioneer in textbook writing. He wrote one of the first Bayesian statistics textbooks, his 1969 Basic Statistics. By the time he retired, he had published over 90 papers and books on dynamic programming, game theory, and mathematical statistics.

Early life and education 
David Harold Blackwell was born on April 24, 1919, in Centralia, Illinois, to Mabel Johnson Blackwell, a full-time homemaker, and Grover Blackwell, an Illinois Central Railroad worker. He was the eldest of four children with two brothers, J. W. and Joseph, and one sister, Elizabeth. Growing up in an integrated community, Blackwell attended "mixed" schools, where he distinguished himself in mathematics. During elementary school, his teachers promoted him beyond his grade level on two occasions. It was in a high school geometry course, however, that his passion for math began. An exceptional student, Blackwell graduated high school in 1935 at the age of sixteen.

Blackwell entered the University of Illinois at Urbana-Champaign with the intent to study elementary school mathematics and become a teacher. He was a member of Alpha Phi Alpha, a black fraternity that housed him for his full six years as a student. He earned his bachelor's degree in mathematics in three years in 1938 and, a year later, a master's degree in 1939. He was awarded a Doctor of Philosophy in mathematics in 1941 at the age of 22. His doctoral advisor was Joseph L. Doob. At the time, Blackwell was the seventh African American to earn a Ph.D. in mathematics in the United States and the first at the University of Illinois at Urbana-Champaign. His doctoral thesis was on Markov chains.

Career and research

Postdoctoral study and early career 
Blackwell completed one year of postdoctoral research as a fellow at the Institute for Advanced Study (IAS) at Princeton in 1941 after receiving a Rosenwald Fellowship, which was a fund to aid black scholars. There he met John von Neumann, who asked Blackwell to discuss his Ph.D. thesis with him. Blackwell, who believed that von Neumann was just being polite and not genuinely interested in his work, did not approach him until von Neumann himself asked him again a few months later. According to Blackwell, "He (von Neumann) listened to me talk about this rather obscure subject and in ten minutes he knew more about it than I did."

While a postdoc at IAS, Blackwell was prevented from attending lectures or undertaking research at nearby Princeton University, which the IAS has historically collaborated with in research and scholarship activities, because of his race.

Seeking a permanent position elsewhere, he wrote letters of application to 104 historically black colleges and universities in 1942, and received a total of only three offers. He felt at the time that a black professor would be limited to teaching at black colleges. Having been highly recommended by his dissertation advisor Joseph L. Doob for a position at the University of California, Berkeley, he was interviewed by statistician Jerzy Neyman. Neyman supported his appointment, and Griffith C. Evans, the head of the mathematics department, at first agreed and even convinced university president Robert Sproul that it was the correct decision, only to subsequently balk, citing the concerns of his wife. It was customary for Evans and his wife to invite the members of the department over for dinner and "she was not going to have any darkie in her house."

He was offered a post at Southern University at Baton Rouge, which he held in from 1942 to 1943, followed by a year as an Instructor at Clark College in Atlanta.

Howard University
Blackwell joined the Mathematics Department at Howard University in 1944. When he joined, he was one of four faculty members and within three years he was appointed full professor and head of the department. He remained at Howard until 1954.

In 1947 while at Howard, Blackwell published the paper "Conditional Expectation and Unbiased Sequential Estimation", which later became known as the Rao-Blackwell theorem. The theorem provides a method for improving statistical estimates by potentially reducing their mean squared error.

From 1948 to 1950, Blackwell spent his summers at RAND Corporation with Meyer A. Girshick and other mathematicians exploring the game theory of duels. In 1954 Girshick and Blackwell published Theory of Games and Statistical Decisions. Aside from von Neumann and Girshick, other Blackwell collaborators and mentors included Leonard J. Savage, Richard E. Bellman, and Nobel Laureate Kenneth J. Arrow.

University of California, Berkeley
Blackwell took a position at the University of California, Berkeley as a visiting professor in 1954, and was hired as a full professor in the newly created Department of Statistics in 1955. He became the Statistics department chair in 1957.

Blackwell bridged topology and game theory via a game-theoretic proof of Kuratowski's theorem in 1967. However, it is worth noting that Blackwell only briefly extended his research beyond zero-sum games to explore the sure-thing principle as introduced by Jimmie Savage, primarily due the real-world societal implications of the mathematical result, particularly for nuclear disarmament at the inception of the Cold War.

Blackwell wrote one of the first Bayesian textbooks, his 1969 Basic Statistics. It inspired the 1995 textbook Statistics: A Bayesian Perspective by the biostatistician Donald Berry.

He spent the rest of his career at UC Berkeley, retiring in 1988 at age 70, which at that time was the mandatory retirement age. Over the course of his career, he mentored over 60 students.

Personal life and death 
Blackwell married Annlizabeth Madison, a 1934 graduate of Spelman College, on December 27, 1944. They had eight children together, three sons and five daughters: Ann, Julia, David, Ruth, Grover, Vera, Hugo, and Sara.

David Blackwell died of complications from a stroke on July 8, 2010, at Alta Bates Summit Medical Center in Berkeley, California. He was 91 years old.

Honors and awards
In his lifetime, Blackwell received 12 honorary doctorates.

 Invited Speaker at the International Congress of Mathematicians, 1954
 President of the Institute of Mathematical Statistics, 1956
 Elected a member of the National Academy of Sciences (NAS), 1965
 Elected a member of the American Academy of Arts and Sciences (AAAS), 1968
 President of the Bernoulli Society for Mathematical Statistics and Probability, 1975-1977
 Honorary Fellow of the Royal Statistical Society (RSS) in 1976
 Vice President of the American Statistical Association (ASA) in 1978
 Awarded the John von Neumann Theory Prize in 1979
 Awarded the R. A. Fisher Lectureship in 1986
 Elected a member of the American Philosophical Society, 1990
 Fellow of the Institute for Operations Research and the Management Sciences, 2002
 Awarded the National Medal of Science (posthumous), 2012

Legacy 
The Mathematical Association of America's MathFest, in coordination with the National Association of Mathematicians, features an annual MAA-NAM David Blackwell Lecture. Blackwell offered the inaugural address in 1994; and subsequent lecturers are researchers who "exemplif[y] the spirit of Blackwell in both personal achievement and service to the mathematical community."

The Blackwell-Tapia prize is named in honor of David Blackwell and Richard A. Tapia.

The University of California, Berkeley named an undergraduate residence hall in his honor, named David Blackwell Hall. The residence hall opened in Fall 2018.

An educational book about his life titled David Blackwell and the Deadliest Duel was published in 2019. 

Blackwell made the following statement about his values and work in an 1983 interview for a project called "Mathematical People":Basically, I'm not interested in doing research and I never have been....I’m interested in understanding, which is quite a different thing. And often to understand something you have to work it out yourself because no one else has done it.

Bibliography

Books

Journal articles

References

External links

 Biographical sketch from the American Statistical Association
 
 David Blackwell's oral history video excerpts at The National Visionary Leadership Project
 A volume dedicated to David H. Blackwell, Celebratio Mathematica
 Biography of David Blackwell from the Institute for Operations Research and the Management Sciences (INFORMS)
David H. Blackwell: A Profile of Inspiration and Perseverance, University of Illinois Urbana-Champaign College of Liberal Arts & Science Department of Statistics
David Blackwell - American statistician and mathematician from Britannica

1919 births
2010 deaths
People from Centralia, Illinois
University of Illinois Urbana-Champaign alumni
University of California, Berkeley College of Letters and Science faculty
Institute for Advanced Study visiting scholars
African-American mathematicians
African-American statisticians
20th-century American mathematicians
American statisticians
Probability theorists
Members of the United States National Academy of Sciences
Presidents of the Institute of Mathematical Statistics
John von Neumann Theory Prize winners
Fellows of the American Statistical Association
Fellows of the Institute for Operations Research and the Management Sciences
National Medal of Science laureates
Game theorists
Academics from Illinois
Mathematicians from Illinois
21st-century American mathematicians
20th-century African-American people
21st-century African-American people
Members of the American Philosophical Society
Mathematical statisticians